Majya Jalmachi Chittarkatha (translated as The Kaleidoscope Story of My Life) is an autobiography of Shantabai Kamble published in 1983. This is considered the first autobiographical narrative by a Dalit woman writer. This book shows the life of Indian woman who was from lower class of the caste.

Plot introduction
The autobiography Majya Jalmachi Chittarkatha by Dalit woman writer Shantabai Kamble, the protagonist of the story, Naja, bears the brunt of class, caste and gender. Naja is from the Mahar caste, one of the biggest Dalit communities in Maharashtra.

Najabai Sakharam Babar (renamed Shantabai Krishnaji Kamble after her marriage), was the first Dalit woman teacher in Solapur district. she began teaching at the Solapur District Board School in 1942. Ten year, in 1952, she completed two years of teacher training and served as an education extension officer in the Jat taluka of Sangli district.

She wrote Mazhya Jalmachi Chittarkatha (The Kaleidoscopic Story of My Life) after she retired from teaching in 1981. It was first serialised in Purva magazine in 1983 and was teleserialised as Najuka on Mumbai Doordarshan in 1990. It has also been translated into French. The word chittarkatha literally means a picture story but also indicates a sense of pieces of pictures being put together like a jigsaw puzzle.

Sources
The Danger of Gender: Caste, Class and Gender in Contemporary Indian Women's Writing by Clara Nubile Published by Sarup & Sons, 2003

References

Marathi people
Marathi-language literature
Indian autobiographies
Dalit literature
1983 non-fiction books
Dalit history
Dalit women